50 California Street (also known as the Union Bank Building) is a , 37-story office tower completed in 1972 at the foot of California Street in the Financial District of San Francisco, California. There is a plaza located at the base of the building. The building is owned and managed by affiliates of Shorenstein Properties.

Gallery

Popular culture
The building is briefly featured in the 2014 science fiction monster film "Godzilla" where during the climax of the film, Godzilla and the male MUTO fought in San Francisco, only for Godzilla to kill the MUTO by slamming him into the side of the building, then the building collapses on top of Godzilla

See also

List of tallest buildings in San Francisco

References

External links

Skyscraper office buildings in San Francisco
Office buildings completed in 1972
Financial District, San Francisco
Welton Becket buildings
Leadership in Energy and Environmental Design gold certified buildings